Jackie Gayle (March 1, 1926 – November 23, 2002), born Jack Potovsky, was an American standup comedian and actor. He performed as a comedian for 40 years, appearing in nightclubs and in Las Vegas, including working as the opening act for such performers as Frank Sinatra and Tony Bennett. He also appeared on more than 20 episodes of The Dean Martin Celebrity Roast. His acting credits include Barry Levinson's Tin Men (1987), Woody Allen's Broadway Danny Rose (1984) and Warren Beatty's Bulworth (1998), among others.

Partial filmography
The Seven Minutes (1971) - Norman Quandt
Wacky Taxi (1972) - Projectionist
Mafia on the Bounty (1980) - Pinky / Captain Bligh
Tempest (1982) - Trinc
Broadway Danny Rose (1984) - Jackie Gayle
Tin Men (1987) - Sam
Plain Clothes (1987) - Coach Zeffer
Bert Rigby, You're a Fool (1989) - I.I. Perlestein
Mr. Saturday Night (1992) - Gene
Bulworth (1998) - Macavoy, Bullworth's Chauffeur

References

External links

American stand-up comedians
American male actors
1926 births
2002 deaths
20th-century American comedians